The men's individual time trial was one of 18 cycling events of the 2016 Summer Olympics. The event started and finished on 10 August at Pontal, a small peninsula and beach area in the Recreio dos Bandeirantes neighborhood, located in the West Zone of Rio de Janeiro, Brazil. The race start and finish were part of the Barra venues cluster and one of seven temporary venues of the 2016 Summer Olympics.

Qualification

Pre-race favourites
Dutchman Tom Dumoulin was seen as the favorite for the gold medal. Other athletes considered to be contenders for the gold were Switzerland's Fabian Cancellara, Australia's Rohan Dennis, Great Britain's Chris Froome, Spain's Ion Izagirre, reigning world time trial champion Vasil Kiryienka of Belarus, Germany's Tony Martin and Portugal's Nelson Oliveira.

Course

Start list and results

Richie Porte of Australia, Vincenzo Nibali of Italy and Wout Poels of the Netherlands were due to participate, but had to withdraw due to injuries as a result of their crashes in the men's road race.  Algeria, Colombia, New Zealand and Venezuela also forfeited places for which they had qualified. Dan Craven of Namibia, and Geraint Thomas of Great Britain were invited to fill two of the vacancies in the field.

References

External links
Rio de Janeiro Olympic venues map (rio2016.com)

Men's road time trial
2016 in men's road cycling
Cycling at the Summer Olympics – Men's individual time trial
Men's events at the 2016 Summer Olympics